The 2021 Bommarito Automotive Group 500 was an IndyCar motor race held on August 21, 2021 at the World Wide Technology Raceway. It was the 13th round of the 2021 IndyCar Series.

Josef Newgarden of Team Penske won his second race of the season, ahead of Arrow McLaren SP driver Pato O'Ward in second and polesitter Will Power in third.

Background 
INDYCAR used only the Saturday of the two-day event, with NASCAR Truck Series racing on Friday and INDYCAR on Saturday, starting at noon and ending on the night of August 21, 2021. It was held one week after the Big Machine Spiked Coolers Grand Prix at Indianapolis and three weeks before the Grand Prix of Portland. It was the last oval race of the 2021 season.

Josef Newgarden was the previous race winner, having won the second race in the 2020 double-header event.

Championship standings before the race 
Álex Palou remained top of the standings with a 21-point gap over Pato O'Ward, despite his dismal 27th place finish at the Big Machine Spiked Coolers Grand Prix. O'Ward, who finished fifth in that race, moved up to second, as Scott Dixon was demoted to third, sitting above Josef Newgarden in fourth and Marcus Ericsson in fifth.

Entrants 
24 drivers entered the race. IndyCar rookie Jimmie Johnson was replaced by Tony Kanaan, who had signed with the team to race in the season's oval races in place of Johnson. Ed Carpenter returned to pilot the No. 20 in a similar deal, replacing Conor Daly, who went to drive the No. 59 Carlin. 

Rookie Romain Grosjean participated in his first oval race, after initially only signing with Dale Coyne Racing to race in road and street courses.

Practice 
Practice took place at 1:15 PM ET and ended with Josef Newgarden topping the charts, with a lap time of 00:25.1715.

Qualifying 
Qualifying was held at 5:00 PM ET. Each driver set two laps in the session. Positions were then determined based on the total time of those two laps.

Will Power won pole position, with a total time of 00:49.8289.

Qualifying classification 

 Notes
  – Álex Palou received a nine-place grid penalty due to an unapproved engine change. He would start the race 21st.

Race 
The race started at 8:00 PM ET. The start, led by Team Penske's Will Power, went underway with no incidents. On lap 2, Power was overtaken by Colton Herta, who assumed the lead of the race. The following lap saw a caution brought out, as Graham Rahal and Ed Jones made contact in Turn 2, sending both drivers into the wall. Both drivers would retire from the race, classifying second last and last respectively. The caution lasted 12 laps. As the race restarted after the caution on lap 15, teammates Josef Newgarden and Simon Pagenaud made contact, damaging the right side of Pagenaud's front wing, which would detach and land on the track, causing another caution that lasted four laps. A light malfunction caused the third caution of the day to be triggered on lap 21, lasting four laps.

On lap 54, Ed Carpenter spun and crashed out of the race in Turn 4, causing the fourth caution of the race, which would last until lap 63. Sébastien Bourdais took the lead of the race, as the front three pitted. Herta lost the effective lead of the race to Newgarden, who exited the pit lane first. Another caution would be declared on lap 65, as Rinus VeeKay crashed into Álex Palou in Turn 1, who then hit the rear of teammate Scott Dixon's car, sending the three into the wall. The race restarted with Newgarden in the lead, after Bourdais made his pit stop.

On lap 139, Herta overtook Newgarden for the lead, but lost it as he pitted on lap 185. Herta would retire from the race as his driveshaft broke during pit exit. On lap 200, Alexander Rossi hit the wall in Turn 2 during his out lap after his final pit stop, ending his race and causing the sixth and final caution of the race, which lasted nine laps. Felix Rosenqvist had a mechanical failure on lap 211, which prompted him to retire from the race.

Josef Newgarden won the race, half a second over Arrow McLaren SP's Pato O'Ward in second. Polesitter Will Power finished third.

Race classification

Championship standings after the race 
Pato O'Ward took the championship lead after his second place finish, with Álex Palou dropping down to second, above race winner Josef Newgarden, who rose to third over Scott Dixon, who was demoted to fourth.

Drivers' Championship standings

Engine manufacturer standings

 Note: Only the top five positions are included.

References

External links 

Bommarito Automotive
Bommarito Automotive Group 500